Kaggalipura is a village along Kanakapura Road on the outskirts of Bangalore, in the southern state of Karnataka, India. Kaggalipura is located on the Bangalore-Coimbatore National Highway 948, around 20 km south of Bangalore. The village is named after the Kaggali tree (Acacia catechu), which grows in abundance locally. The village was established after clearing several Kaggali trees from the area, hence the name Kaggalipura. 

Kaggalipura is 23 km from Majestic Bus Station in Bangalore and 13 km from Uttarahalli. It is 16 km from Banashankari Temple, 17 km from Global Village Tech Park in Rajarajeshwari Nagar, 18 km from Kengeri via NICE Road, 21 km from Electronic City, 16 km from Meenakshi Mall o Bannerghatta Road and 1.5 km from Sri Sri Ravishankar Ashram. Hindus are the largest religious group in the village with their gramadevate (village deity) being Patallamma Devi.

Demographics 
, according to the census in India, Kaggalipura had a population of 6,907, consisting of 3,562 males and 3,345 females.

Birds in Kaggalipura 
Kaggalipura is a notable destination for bird watching in Bangalore. The village lies within Bannerghatta National Park and is home to a wide variety of birds.

References

External links 

 https://web.archive.org/web/20071116153217/http://bangaloreurban.nic.in/

Villages in Bangalore Urban district